Georgi Ilyich Ryabov (23 August 1938 – 16 June 2020) was a Soviet football player.

Honours
 Soviet Top League winner: 1963.
 Soviet Cup winner: 1967, 1970.

International career
Ryabov made his debut for USSR on 22 May 1963 in a friendly against Sweden. He played in the 1966 FIFA World Cup qualifiers, but was not selected for the final tournament squad.

External links
  Profile

References

1938 births
2020 deaths
Footballers from Tallinn
Russian footballers
Soviet footballers
Soviet Union international footballers
Soviet Top League players
FC Dynamo Moscow players
Association football defenders